Bellylove is a rock band featured on the third season premiere of the hit TV series Buffy the Vampire Slayer.  The show featured their song "Back to Freedom."  The band consists of Lisa Rae Black, Toni Valenta. Their first two EPs were produced and recorded by Mick Michelbach with the help of Roderick Wilson on drums and featured mostly acoustic adult contemporary music.  The latter two members joined after their appearance on the popular television show.

Lisa Rae Black, a veteran of the Los Angeles music scene, recruited Valenta after the demise of her project featuring Barbi Von Greif, which was produced by Dave Rouse and Pierre de Beauport of the Rolling Stones' road crew.  Before working with Von Greif, Black spent many years playing the Sunset Strip in the band Hardly Dangerous featuring Tomi Rae Hynie (Brown).

After their appearance on Buffy, they recruited Clint Davidson and Chris Russo to play some shows locally.  The sound of the band has changed over the years and has featured many drummers, such as Becky Wreck of the Lunachicks, Sheri Kaplan (Weinstein) of The Pandoras and Hardly Dangerous, and Adam Steinberg.

External links 
 Official site

References

Alternative rock groups from California
Musical groups from Los Angeles
Musical groups established in 1998